Susita may refer to:

Autocars Co., a former Israeli car company
Sussita, an ancient city in Israel
Şuşiţa (disambiguation), several places in Romania